John Seymour of Stapleford in Wilton, Wiltshire, and of Wulfhall in Savernake Forest, Wiltshire  (c. 1463) was an English landowner and Member of Parliament.

Life
Probably born at Wulfhall, in Savernake Forest, Wiltshire, Seymour was the eldest son of Sir John Seymour of Wulfhall, Wiltshire, and of Hatch Beauchamp, Somerset (c. 1395 or 1402, died 20 December 1464) by his marriage on 30 July 1424 to Isabel William or Williams (died 14 April 1486), daughter of Mark William, a merchant and Mayor of Bristol, in Gloucestershire, in some sources given as William Macwilliam "of Gloucestershire".

He was a Knight of the Shire for Wiltshire and was High Sheriff of Wiltshire in 1450–1451 and 1457–1458.

Marriage and issue
He married firstly Jane Arundell, without issue, and married secondly Elizabeth Coker or Croker (born c. 1436), daughter of Sir Robert Coker of Lydeard St Lawrence, Somerset, or daughter of Sir John Croker of Lineham (died 1506, son of Sir John Croker and Elizabeth Yeo) and Elizabeth Fortescue (born c. 1436, daughter of Sir Richard Fortescue and Agnes Windsor and widow of Sir Nicholas Carew of Haccombe), sister of William Croker and Anna Croker, wife of John Gilbert, and had three sons:
 John Seymour (c. 1450 – 26 October 1491), of Wulfhall, married firstly Elizabeth Darell or Darrell (born c. 1451), daughter of Sir George Darell or Darrell (died c. 1474) and Margaret Stourton (born c. 1433), a daughter of John Stourton, 1st Baron Stourton and Margery or Marjory Wadham, and had eight children, and married secondly a daughter of Robert Hardon and had one son:
 Margaret Seymour (born Wulfhall, Wiltshire, c. 1468), married Sir Nicholas Wadham and had two children, Jane Wadham and Nicholas Wadham
 Jane Seymour (born Wulfhall, Wiltshire, c. 1469), married John Huddlestone
 Elizabeth Seymour (born Wulfhall, Wiltshire, c. 1471), married John Croft
 John Seymour (1474–1536)
 Catherine Seymour
 Sir George Seymour, Kt., High Sheriff of Wiltshire in 1498
 Robert Seymour
 William Seymour (born Wulfhall, Wiltshire, c. 1478), married Margaret Byconnyll
 Roger Seymour (Andover, Hampshire, c. 1480 – bef. 1509), married and had four daughters and one son: 
Isabel/ Isobell Seymour (Marton, Kent, 1494-1525), married Richard Marsh/ Marche, had as sons John Marche, Thomas Marsh, and Henry Marsh/ Marche. Isabel was the 5th great-grandmother of William Rogers, of Rogers Plantation, Surry, Virginia
Agnes Seymour (born Andover, Hampshire, c. 1498), married Richard Forde
Margery Seymour (Andover, Hampshire, 1501-1520)
John Seymour (born Andover, Hampshire, 1502-1509)
Joan/ Jane Seymour (born Andover, Hampshire, c. 1503), married Thomas Corderay and had one son, Thomas Corderay (1520–1582);
 Alexander Seymour
 Humphrey Seymour, Esq., of Wendlebury, Oxfordshire, and of Even Swindon, Wiltshire (1453/1454 – living 1509), married Elizabeth Winslowe, daughter of Thomas Winslowe of Eldersfield, Worcestershire

Notes

High Sheriffs of Wiltshire
1420s births
1460s deaths
John, 1463
English MPs 1450
15th-century English landowners